Markko may refer to:

Markko Märtin, Estonian rally driver
Markko Rivera, fictional character on ABC's daytime drama One Life to Live.
Markko Vineyards, winery founded in Conneaut, Ohio.